Alexander Waske  (born 31 March 1975) is a retired tennis player from Germany.

Waske was ranked as high as world No. 16 in doubles, winning four titles. He achieved his career-high singles ranking of world No. 89 in June 2006. In 2010, Waske and his former Davis Cup companion Rainer Schüttler founded the Schüttler Waske Tennis-University, a tennis academy for professional players.

Waske twice beat players in the final qualifying rounds of tournaments who later got into the main draw as lucky losers and caused big historical upsets. In the 2002 Wimbledon final qualifying round at Roehampton, Waske beat George Bastl, before lucky loser Bastl later beat Pete Sampras in the second round of the 2002 Wimbledon tournament, in one of the greatest upsets in tennis history. In the final qualifying round for Indian Wells in 2007, Waske beat Guillermo Cañas, before lucky loser Cañas later beat Roger Federer in the second round of the 2007 Indian Wells tournament, ending Federer's 41–match unbeaten run.

ATP career finals

Doubles: 8 (4–4)

Grand Slam performance timelines

Singles

Doubles

Wins over top 10 players

References

External links
 
 
 
 Official website of Alexander Waske 

1975 births
German male tennis players
Living people
Tennis players from Frankfurt
Eintracht Frankfurt athletes
San Diego State Aztecs men's tennis players